The Apple (translit. Sib) is the 1998 directorial debut by Samira Makhmalbaf, daughter of Iranian director Mohsen Makhmalbaf. The film is based on a true story and features the real people that actually lived it. The film was screened in the Un Certain Regard section at the 1998 Cannes Film Festival.

Plot
Two daughters are locked up by their parents; an unemployed man and his blind wife, for eleven years. Their neighbours call social workers to investigate the situation and the results lead the girls on a bittersweet path to the rest of the world.

Cast
 Massoumeh Naderi - Massoumeh
 Zahra Naderi - Zahra
 Ghorban Ali Naderi - Father
 Azizeh Mohamadi - Azizeh
 Zahra Saghrisaz

Reception
The film received a positive reaction from critics. On Rotten Tomatoes, it holds a rating of 85% from 48 reviews.

References

External links

1998 films
1990s Persian-language films
1998 drama films
Films directed by Samira Makhmalbaf
1998 directorial debut films
Iranian drama films
Films about disability